Akbara is an Arab village in the Israeli municipality of Safed, which included in 2010 more than 200 families. It is 2.5 km south of Safed City. The village was rebuilt in 1977, close to the old village destroyed in 1948 during  the 1947–1949 Palestine war.

Location 
The village of 'Akbara was situated 2.5 km south of Safad, along the two sides of a deep wadi that ran north–south. Southeast of the village lay Khirbet al-'Uqeiba, identified as the Roman village Achabare, or Acchabaron. This khirba was a populated village as late as 1904.

History 

The first 'Akbara mention is during Second Temple period by Josephus Flavius, he noted the rock of Acchabaron (Ακχαβαρων πετραν) among the places in the Upper Galilee he fortified as a preparation for the  Jewish Revolt. At the time Josephus Flavius was commanding Jewish rebel forces fighting Romans  in the Galilee.

The nearby Khirbet al-'Uqeiba was first excavated during the Mandate period, and was shown to contain remains such as building foundations, hewn stones, and wine presses. Cisterns, tombs, oil press and walls of ancient synagogue  have also been found. Foerster identifies the ruins as the  "early Galilean type" synagogue. Above the settlement, a 135 m high vertical cliff is located. There are one hundred and twenty-nine natural and man-made caves interconnected by passages in the cliff. According to tradition, those caves were used for shelter by Jews during their war with Romans. During archeological excavations, coins from Dor and Sepphoris were found in the caves, dating to the Roman emperor Trajan period.

Akbara/Akbari/Akbora/Akborin is mentioned several times in Rabbinic literature as early as second half of the third century CE. According to some traditions Rabbi Yannai disciplines lived in 'Akbara forming an agricultural community; R. Yannai established a bet midrash there. The earliest mention of this bet midrash is in the context of discussions between Rabbi Yohanan and sages of 'Akbara. According to Talmud school of Rabbi Jose bar Abin was also in Akbara.  Several of the rabbis mentioned in Pirkei Avot lived in 'Akbara. Akbara is mentioned as the burial place of several Talmudic sages: Rabbi Nehurai also Rabbi Yannai and Rabbi Dostai his son are buried "in the gardens" "by the spring".  According to tradition, the body of Rabbi Elazar ben Simeon was laying for twenty two years in his widow's garret in Akbara since he told her not to allow his colleagues to bury him. Rabbi Elazar ben Simeon feared to be dishonoured due to his aid to the Romans.

The local Jewish community is attested during Fatimid rule of 969 to 1099 by the Cairo Geniza. Samuel ben Samson visited 'Akbara during his 1210 Palestine pilgrimage, he described the tomb of Rabbi Meir he had found there.  In 1258 Jacob of Paris visited Akbara and found there, according to Pirkei Avot, tombs of Rabbi Nehurai.

Ottoman era
'Akbara, was incorporated into the Ottoman Empire in 1517. Moshe Basola visited the village In 1522 and said that he had found there "destroyed synagogue, 3 cubits high remaining on two sides". Later in 1968 the remains of the synagogue were identified by Foester.  In the census of 1596 the village was part of the  nahiya ("subdistrict") of Jira, part of Liwa Safad, with a population of 36 households and 1 bachelor, all Muslims. It paid taxes on a number of crops and produce, including wheat, barley, summer crops,   olives, occasional revenues, goats,  beehives, and a press which was either used for processing grapes or olives; a total of 6,115 akçe. 6/24 of the revenue went to a waqf.

In 1648 a Turkish traveler Evliya Tshelebi visited Galilee and reflected on history of Akbara cliff caves, which according to tradition were used as a shelter by Jews: "The children of Israel escaped the plague and hid in
these caves. Then Allah sent them a bad spirit which caused them to perish within the caves. Their skeletons, heaped together, can be seen there to this day."

In 1838, it was noted as a village in the Safad district, while in 1875 Victor Guérin visited, and described it: "The ruins of Akbara cover a hillock whose slopes were formerly sustained by walls forming terraces; the threshing floors of an Arab village occupy the summit. Round these are grouped the remains of ancient constructions now overthrown."
"The village lies on the east of the wady. It is dominated by a platform on which foundations can be traced of a rectangular enclosure called el Kuneiseh, measuring thirty paces in length by twenty-three in breadth. It stands east and west, and was firmly constructed of good cut stones. The interior is at present given up to cultivation. This enclosure seems to have been once a Christian church."

In 1881, the PEF's Survey of Western Palestine (SWP)  described Akbara as a village built of stone and adobe with about 90 inhabitants who cultivated olive and fig trees.

A population list from about 1887 showed  Akbara to have about 335 inhabitants, all Muslims.

British Mandate era

In the 1922 census of Palestine conducted by the British Mandate authorities, Akbara  had a population of 147; all Muslims, increasing in the 1931 census to 275, still all  Muslims, in a total of 49 houses.

During this  period the village houses were made of masonry.  In  the  1945 statistics the population was 390 Muslims,  and the total land area was 3,224  dunums;  2,222 dunums was used for  cereals, 199 dunums were irrigated or used for orchards, while 6 dunams were built-up (urban) land.

Israeli era 
During the siege of Safad 'Akbara was targeted for occupation in line with Plan D. The Hagana attack was launched on 9 May and completed by the Palmach first battalion. It was found that many of the villagers had fled due to news of Deir Yassin and 'Ein al Zeitun, the village was then blown up and destroyed.

On 25 May 1948, during Operation Yiftah, under the command of Yigal Allon, Galilee was cleared of its Palestinian Arab population. The Palmach's First Battalion. Following the 25 May exodus of al-Khisas the last 55 villagers who had remained in their homes for just over a year were 'transferred' by Israeli forces despite having good relations and collaborating with Jewish settlements in the area. During the night of 5/6 June 1949, the village of al-Khisas was surrounded by trucks and the villagers were forced into the trucks ’with kicks, curses and maltreatment,’ in the words of a Mapam Knesset member, Elizer Peri, quoted by Morris: "The remaining villagers said that they had been ’forced with their hands to destroy their dwellings,’ and had been treated like ’cattle.’ They were then dumped on a bare, sun-scorched hillside near the village of ’Akbara [by then an abandoned Palestinian Arab village] where they were left ’wandering in the wilderness, thirsty and hungry.’ They lived there under inhuman conditions for years afterwards," along with the inhabitants of at least two other villages (Qaddita and al-Ja'una) expelled in similar circumstances. The expellees remained at ’Akbara for eighteen years until agreeing to resettlement in Wadi Hamam.

Salman Abu-Sitta, author of the Atlas of Palestine, estimated that the number of Palestinian refugees from 'Akbara in 1998 was 1,852 people.

Of what remains of 'Akbara's built structures, Walid Khalidi wrote in 1992 that, "The original inhabitants of the village were replaced by "internal" refugees from Qaddita villages several kilometers north of Safad. Since 1980, however, these internal refugees have been gradually relocated to the nearby, planned village of 'Akbara, 0.5 km west of the old village site. As a precondition of the relocation, each family was required to demolish its home in the former village. Today, fifteen of the old houses still stand on the site, in addition to the school. The new village of 'Akbara was placed under the administration of the city of Safad in 1977. It is now a neighbourhood of the city of Safed.

See also 

 List of massacres committed during the 1948 Arab-Israeli war

References

Bibliography 

 (p. 205)

External links 
 Welcome to Akbara 
 'Akbara,  Zochrot 
Survey of Western Palestine, Map 4: IAA, Wikimedia commons 
 'Akbara,  at Khalil Sakakini Cultural Center
 Akbara,  Dr. Khalil Rizk.
3akbara from Dr. Moslih Kanaaneh 

Arab villages depopulated prior to the 1948 Arab–Israeli War
District of Safad
Safed
Establishments in the Herodian kingdom
Ancient Jewish settlements of Galilee